Mundo Maya International Airport, formerly Flores International Airport as indicated by its 3-letter code, is an international airport located in the suburb of Santa Elena, in the city of Flores, Guatemala. It serves national and international air traffic for the areas of Flores, Santa Elena, and San Benito, as well as all the Maya sites like Tikal or Yaxhá and destinations like Guatemala City and Belize.

The airport lacks many amenities compared to other airports its size. It only has 1 small cafe landside and a large sitting area airside. Despite its size and lack of jetbridges, lounges, and restaurant it is still Guatemala's second busiest airport.

Mundo Maya Airport, like other airports in Guatemala, is going through some expansions, to provide a better service to passengers and airlines, so it will be able to accept a greater number of flights and larger aircraft.
In 2012, the ICAO airport identifier for Mundo Maya International Airport changed from MGTK to MGMM.

Airlines and destinations

Statistics
Mundo Maya International airport is the country's second and it is one of the busiest airports in Central America. In 2018, Mundo Maya International Airport reported 144,772 passengers, a 5.4% yearly increase

Accidents and incidents
 On 30 September 1977, Douglas C47A TG-AKA of Aviateca was damaged beyond economic repair in a landing accident. One of the three crew members was killed.
 On 26 July 1978, Douglas DC-3 TG-AFA of Aviateca overran the runway following a birdstrike on take-off and was reported to have been damaged beyond economic repair. The aircraft was later repaired and returned to service.
 On 7 May 1979, Douglas DC-3 TG-SAB of TAPSA was substantially damaged in a landing accident when it departed the runway and collided with a car. The aircraft was subsequently repaired and returned to service.
 On 18 January 1986, a Sud Aviation SE-210 Caravelle III from Aerovias, crashed into a hill on its final approach, about 8 km from the airport. All 93 passengers and crew on board were killed, making it the worst air disaster in Guatemalan history.

See also
 
 
 Transport in Guatemala
 List of airports in Guatemala

References

External links
 Dirección General de Aeronáutica Civil

Airports in Guatemala
Petén Department